Initial Records was an independent record label in Louisville, Kentucky, that was founded in 1992. The label released music by Falling Forward, Boysetsfire and Ink & Dagger, and created the annual weekend long music festival, Krazy Fest.

History
Initial was founded in 1992 in a Dunkin' Donuts in suburban Detroit by three high school friends, Dennis Hepinstall, Carolyn Smith and Andy Rich. Their first issue was a re-release of the 7" single from local Detroit based hardcore band Pittbull.

Carolyn's interest waned early in the project after her long standing relationship with Dennis ended and she bowed out. Dennis would stick around for another few years while Andy attended the Haworth College of Business at Western Michigan University. By 1995 Dennis had enough and ended his tenure with the label as well. After graduating college with a bachelor of business administration in 1996 Andy relocated to Louisville, KY and took the label with him.

Over the next few years Initial would blossom into one of independent music's most well known labels. The April 1998 issue of Playboy magazine declared Initial one of the country's ten hottest record labels. The May 1998 issue of Alternative Press magazine named Initial as one of "Ten independent labels that have helped to change not only the way hardcore sounds, but the way it does business."

Krazy Fest

Krazy Fest was founded by several Initial Records employees. It was a weekend long music and lifestyle festival that ran annually for six years from 1998 through 2003, with a reprisal in 2011.

Final release
Initial's last release to date was a posthumous CD from Louisville hardcore band By The Grace Of God in 2004. It was a benefit to help pay medical bills for local Louisville scenester Adele Collins. The band also played a reunion show in conjunction with the release.

Epilogue
Longtime Initial Records label chief Andy Rich now resides in Las Vegas where he is the Director of Poker Operations at Golden Nugget Hotel & Casino.

The label's impact was described by Alternative Press in 2013: "While largely associated with Louisville, Kentucky, hardcore, Initial did more than just (exhaustively) cover that scene—it focused on the Midwest, covering bands from Detroit, Chicago, Omaha and more."

Bands

Black Cross
Black Widows
Blood Red
Boysetsfire
Blue Sky Mile
Criteria
Despair
Elliott
The Enkindels
Falling Forward
Guilt
Harkonen
Helicopter Helicopter
Ink & Dagger
The Jazz June
Lords

Blue Sky Mile
The Movielife
The National Acrobat
Pittbull
Planes Mistaken for Stars
The Reputation
Ricochet
Roy
Peter Searcy
Shipping News
Silent Majority
Slugfest
Ultimate Fakebook
The White Octave

See also
 List of record labels

References

Defunct record labels of the United States
American independent record labels
Record labels established in 1992
Defunct companies based in Louisville, Kentucky
1992 establishments in Michigan
American companies established in 1992
Record labels disestablished in 2004
2004 disestablishments in Kentucky